Draft Declaration may refer to:
Drafting of the Universal Declaration of Human Rights, the process of writing the UDHR
Draft Declaration of the Revolutionary Insurgent Army of Ukraine, a Ukrainian anarchist manifesto
Draft Declaration on the Rights of Indigenous Peoples